UFC Fight Night: Maia vs. Askren (also known as  UFC Fight Night 162 or  UFC on ESPN+ 20) was a mixed martial arts event produced by the Ultimate Fighting Championship that took place on October 26, 2019 at the Singapore Indoor Stadium in Kallang, Singapore.

Background 
A welterweight bout between former UFC Welterweight and Middleweight Championship challenger Demian Maia and former Bellator Welterweight Champion and former ONE Welterweight Champion, Ben Askren headlined the event.

A heavyweight bout between Greg Hardy and Jarjis Danho was scheduled for the event. However, Danho was pulled from the event for an undisclosed reason. He was replaced by Ben Sosoli on September 19 and the bout moved to UFC on ESPN: Reyes vs. Weidman a week earlier.

Yan Xiaonan was scheduled to face Ashley Yoder at the event. However, Yan pulled out of the fight in late-September citing a foot injury. She was replaced by Randa Markos.

Ian Heinisch was scheduled to face Brad Tavares at the event. However, Heinisch was removed from the pairing in early October for undisclosed reasons. In turn, Tavares was removed from the event entirely and rescheduled to face Edmen Shahbazyan a week later at UFC 244.

Karol Rosa was scheduled to face Julia Avila at the event. However, Rosa pulled out of the fight in mid-October citing a knee injury and the bout was scrapped.

Results

Bonus awards
The following fighters received $50,000 bonuses.
Fight of the Night: Demian Maia vs. Ben Askren
Performance of the Night: Beneil Dariush and Ciryl Gane

See also 

 List of UFC events
 2019 in UFC
 List of current UFC fighters

References 

UFC Fight Night
Mixed martial arts in Singapore
2019 in mixed martial arts
Sport in Singapore
2019 in Singapore
October 2019 sports events in Asia